John J. Reedy (born August 23, 1927) was an American politician in the state of South Dakota. He was a member of the South Dakota House of Representatives and South Dakota State Senate. He graduated from Vermillion High School in 1945, and later served in the United States Navy. He also owned a hardware store.

References

Living people
South Dakota Democrats
1927 births
People from Haakon County, South Dakota
People from Vermillion, South Dakota